The twelfth election to Cardiganshire County Council took place in March 1925. It was preceded by the 1922 election and followed by the 1928 election. While the previous election had been held in the shadow of bitter Liberal infighting at parliamentary level, the temperature had cooled and only ten seats were contested.

Candidates

The election saw only ten contests, compared with 24 three years previously. With hindsight this can be seen as the start of half century of Independent domination in the local politics of Cardiganshire. Although political affiliations were no longer a feature of most contests the split in the Liberal ranks between Coalition and Asquithian Liberals had largely disappeared and some individuals had drifted away from Liberalism towards the Conservatives (one example being Morgan Lloyd Williams at Ysbyty Ystwyth).

Retiring aldermen

Eight aldermen retired, seven of whom were Liberals and one Conservative, R.S. Rowland of Gareth, Llangybi. Two of their number, D.C. Roberts (who had previously contested his seat at Aberystwyth) and the sole Conservative sought election.

The other retiring aldermen were the Rev. John Williams, Cardigan, who had not faced the electorate for many years; the Rev William Griffiths (New Quay), the Rev T. Mason Jones, (Devil's Bridge) and R.J.R. Loxdale (Llanilar) who last faced an election in 1913;  and John Morgan Howell (Aberaeron) and Thomas Davies (Newcastle Emlyn) who had been elected to fill vacancies in recent years.

Contested elections

Only ten seats were contested and these were largely fought on non-political lines. Two seats can be said to have changed hands but in both cases this resulted in the sitting member not seeking re-election. At Lampeter, J.C. Harford's seat was won by a Liberal and at Llangybi, the sitting Liberal stood down allowing Alderman R.S. Rowland, the Garth, to be returned unopposed.

Outcome

Very little change resulted from the election of 1925. Three members of the originally elected council in 1889 remained as members, namely Aldermen John Morgan Howell, Peter Jones and C.M. Williams.

Results

Aberaeron

Aberbanc

Aberporth

Aberystwyth Division 1

Aberystwyth Division 2

Aberystwyth Division 3

Aberystwyth Division 4

Aberystwyth Division 5

Aberystwyth Division 6

Aeron

}

Borth

Bow Street

Cardigan North

Cardigan South

Cilcennin

Cwmrheidol

Devil's Bridge

Felinfach

Goginan

Lampeter Borough

Llanarth

Llanbadarn Fawr

Llanddewi Brefi

Llandygwydd

Llandysul North

Llandysul South

Llansysiliogogo

Llanfair Clydogau

Llanfarian

Llanfihangel y Creuddyn

Llangoedmor

Llangeitho

Llangrannog

Llanilar

Llanrhystyd

Llanllwchaiarn

Llansantffraed

Llanwnen

Llanwenog

Lledrod

Nantcwnlle

New Quay

Penbryn

Strata Florida

Taliesin

Talybont

Trefeurig

Tregaron

Troedyraur

Ysbyty Ystwyth

Election of Aldermen
Eight aldermen were elected, including one Conservative, Dr John Morgan, who replaced R.S. Rowland. As well as Dr Morgan, Evan Lewis, Samuel Jones and D. Morgan James became new aldermen, while retiring alderman D.C. Roberts had yet again been returned unopposed at Aberystwyth.

Of the three retiring aldermen re-appointed without facing the electorate, J.M. Howell had fought a contested election in 1922 and was re-appointed as alderman after the death of E. Lima Jones. Loxdale had last been returned unopposed in 1910 while the Rev. John Williams had not stood as a candidate since 1898.

Evan Lewis, Llanllwchaiarn, 48
Rev. John Williams, Cardigan, 47
D.C. Roberts, Aberystwyth, 48
R.J.R. Loxdale, Llanilar, 47
John Morgan Howell, Aberaeron, 47
Dr John Morgan, Pontrhydygroes, 46
Samuel Jones, Llangrannog, 45
D. Morgan James, Llanrhystud, 37

By-elections

Aberystwyth, Division 4 by-election
E.J. Evans, Cwncybarcud, who previously represented Llanrhystud from 1901 until 1904 was returned unopposed following the appointment of R.J.R. Loxdale as alderman.

Llangrannog by-election
A Liberal candidate was returned unopposed for Lledrod following the appointment of Daniel L. Jones as alderman.

Llanllwchaiarn by-election
Following the appointment of E.J. Davies as alderman no valid nomination was initially received.

Llanrhystud by-election

Strata Florida by-election

Notes

References

1925
1925 Welsh local elections
20th century in Ceredigion